The Cotton Club may refer to:
 Cotton Club, a famous nightclub in New York City
 Cotton Club (Portland, Oregon), a now-defunct club
 The Cotton Club (film), a 1984 film centered on the New York club
 The Cotton Club (soundtrack)

See also 
 Cotton Club (disambiguation)